The 2017–2018 Bryant Bulldogs men's basketball team represented Bryant University during the 2017–18 NCAA Division I men's basketball season. The team, led by 10th-year head coach Tim O'Shea, played their home games at the Chace Athletic Center in Smithfield, Rhode Island as members of the Northeast Conference. They finished the season 3–28, 2–16 in NEC play to finish in last place. They failed to qualify for the NEC tournament.

On February 12, 2018, Tim O'Shea announced that he would retire at the end of the season. He finished at Bryant with a ten-year record of 96–210. On April 2, the school hired Iona assistant Jared Grasso as head coach.

Previous season 
The Bulldogs finished the 2016–17 season 12–20, 9–9 in NEC play to finish tied for fifth place. They participated in the NEC tournament, losing in the quarterfinals to Saint Francis (PA).

Preseason 
In a poll of league coaches at the NEC media day, the Bulldogs were picked to finish in eighth place.

Roster

Schedule and results

|-
!colspan=9 style=| Non-conference regular season

  

    
|-
!colspan=9 style=| NEC regular season

References

Bryant Bulldogs men's basketball seasons
Bryant
Bryant
Bryant